Good at Falling is the debut studio album by English indie pop musician Amber Bain, under the name The Japanese House. It was released on 1 March 2019 by Dirty Hit, after Bain released four extended plays spanning three years; Pools to Bathe In, Clean, Swim Against the Tide and Saw You in a Dream. The album was produced by Amber Bain alongside BJ Burton and The 1975 drummer/producer George Daniel.

Reception 
Good at Falling received positive reviews.

Track listing

Notes
 Track 12 features backing vocals by Matty Healy.

Charts

References

2019 debut albums
The Japanese House albums